Daryl Impey (born 6 December 1984) is a South African professional road cyclist, who currently rides for UCI WorldTeam . Impey is an all-rounder; he generally comes to the fore on tough uphill sprints.

Impey is a two-time winner of the Tour Down Under, and the only rider to have won the race in consecutive years, winning in 2018, and 2019. He has won the South African National Road Race Championships twice, and is a nine-time winner of the South African National Time Trial Championships, including eight consecutive titles between 2013 and 2020. In 2013, Impey became the first South African rider to wear the yellow jersey at the Tour de France, doing so for two days; six years later, he won his first individual stage at the race, winning the ninth stage in Brioude.

Career

After riding for the South African team  in 2008 and 2009, in 2010 Impey joined . Impey had originally signed for 2011 with the Australian team called Pegasus, but was forced to seek employment elsewhere after that team failed to secure a UCI license. He won a stage of the Tour of the Basque Country in April of that year, before making his Grand Tour debut at the Giro d'Italia in May. In 2013, he became the first South African ever to lead the Tour de France.

He won the Tour of Alberta in 2014 by a single second thanks to his victory in the last stage, which gave him enough bonus seconds to overtake Tom Dumoulin. Impey confirmed his good form a couple of days later by taking the fourth place on the Grand Prix Cycliste de Québec.

In 2015, Impey had to abandon the Tour de France after being involved in a massive crash on the third stage. He was named in the start list for the 2015 Vuelta a España.

In August 2020, it was announced that Impey was to join  from the 2021 season – alongside his former  teammate Chris Froome – on a two-year contract.

Major results

2003
 1st  Road race, National Under-23 Road Championships
2004
 National Under-23 Road Championships
1st  Time trial
2nd Road race
 1st Stage 5 Giro del Capo
 6th Overall Tour de Tunisie
2006
 African Road Championships
3rd  Time trial
4th Road race
2007
 1st  Road race, All-Africa Games
 Giro del Capo
1st Points classification
1st Prologue & Stage 2
 1st Stage 10 Tour du Maroc
2008
 1st Stage 6 Herald Sun Tour
 6th Memorial Viviana Manservisi
 9th World's View Challenge 1
 9th World's View Challenge 2
2009
 1st  Overall Tour of Turkey
1st  Points classification
1st Stage 4
 2nd Road race, National Road Championships
 3rd Giro del Capo II
 7th Giro del Capo IV
2011
 1st  Time trial, National Road Championships
 2nd Overall Tour du Maroc
1st Stage 7
 3rd Overall Tour of South Africa
 9th Overall Tour of Azerbaijan (Iran)
2012
 1st Stage 2 Tour of the Basque Country
 1st Stage 2 Tour of Slovenia
2013
 1st  Time trial, National Road Championships
 Tour de France
1st Stage 4 (TTT)
Held  after Stages 6–7
 1st Stage 2 Tour of the Basque Country
 1st Stage 2 Bayern–Rundfahrt
 2nd  Team time trial, UCI Road World Championships
 5th Overall Eneco Tour
 5th Vuelta a La Rioja
2014
 National Road Championships
1st  Time trial
2nd Road race
 1st  Overall Tour of Alberta
1st Stage 5
 4th Grand Prix Cycliste de Québec
 7th Overall Bayern–Rundfahrt
1st Stage 3
 7th Overall Tour Down Under
2015
 National Road Championships
1st  Time trial
2nd Road race
 2nd Vuelta a La Rioja
 3rd 947 Cycle Challenge
 6th Overall Tour des Fjords
 6th Classic Sud-Ardèche
 7th Overall Tour Down Under
1st  Sprints classification
2016
 1st  Time trial, National Road Championships
 3rd  Team time trial, UCI Road World Championships
2017
 1st  Time trial, National Road Championships
 1st 947 Cycle Challenge
 1st Stage 6 Volta a Catalunya
2018
 National Road Championships
1st  Road race
1st  Time trial
 1st  Overall Tour Down Under
 Critérium du Dauphiné
1st  Points classification
1st Stage 1
 3rd Cadel Evans Great Ocean Road Race
 8th GP Industria & Artigianato di Larciano
 10th Brabantse Pijl
2019
 National Road Championships
1st  Road race
1st  Time trial
 1st  Overall Tour Down Under
1st Stage 4
 1st  Overall Czech Cycling Tour
1st  Points classification
1st Stage 1 (TTT)
 1st Stage 9 Tour de France
 3rd Cadel Evans Great Ocean Road Race
2020
 National Road Championships
1st  Time trial
2nd Road race
 3rd Cadel Evans Great Ocean Road Race
 6th Overall Tour Down Under
2021
 2nd La Drôme Classic
2022
 1st Stage 4 Tour de Suisse
 2nd  Road race, Commonwealth Games

Grand Tour general classification results timeline

References

External links

 

1984 births
Living people
Cyclists from Johannesburg
South African male cyclists
South African Tour de France stage winners
Cyclists at the 2012 Summer Olympics
Cyclists at the 2016 Summer Olympics
Olympic cyclists of South Africa
Presidential Cycling Tour of Turkey winners
Presidential Cycling Tour of Turkey stage winners
African Games gold medalists for South Africa
African Games medalists in cycling
Competitors at the 2007 All-Africa Games
White South African people
Tour de Suisse stage winners
Commonwealth Games silver medallists for South Africa
Commonwealth Games medallists in cycling
Cyclists at the 2022 Commonwealth Games
Medallists at the 2022 Commonwealth Games